Kerron Thomas van Vuuren (born 23 May 1995) is a South African rugby union player for the  in Super Rugby and in the Currie Cup.  He usually plays as a hooker.

References

South African rugby union players
Living people
1995 births
Rugby union players from Durban
Rugby union hookers
Sharks (Currie Cup) players
Sharks (rugby union) players
Southern Kings players